Chineke! Orchestra is a British orchestra, the first professional orchestra in Europe to be made up of majority Black & ethnically diverse musicians. The word Chineke derives from the Igbo language meaning "God". The orchestra was founded by musician Chi-chi Nwanoku CBE and their debut concert was in 2015 at Queen Elizabeth Hall in London.

Background 
Nwanoku, the orchestra's founder, coined its name from the word "Chi" in the Igbo language, which refers to "the god of creation of all good things", or "the spirit of creation". She was inspired by the use of the term in the novel Things Fall Apart by Chinua Achebe.

Nwanoku has acknowledged that inspiration for founding the orchestra came from a conversation with Ed Vaizey, then the UK Minister of Culture, who noted to her that she was one of the very few musicians of colour on stage in a classical orchestra.  She also took inspiration from attending a London concert of the Kinshasa Symphony, from the Democratic Republic of Congo, where the orchestra was all-black, but the audience was almost entirely white.

History
The Chineke! Foundation was established in 2015, and its parallel orchestra followed in the same year, with the express purpose of providing "career opportunities to young Black and Minority Ethnic (BAME) classical musicians in the UK and Europe".  The ensemble debuted at the Queen Elizabeth Hall, Southbank Centre in London in September 2015, conducted by Wayne Marshall, and highlighting works by Black British composers, such as Samuel Coleridge-Taylor’s Ballade for Orchestra and Elegy: In memoriam – Stephen Lawrence by Philip Herbert.  The orchestra for its first two concerts comprised exclusively black, Asian and minority ethnic musicians, but it has since included white musicians.  Chineke! became a resident orchestra at the Southbank Centre in 2016.  The orchestra made its debut at The Proms in August 2017, conducted by Kevin John Edusei.

In 2017, the orchestra made its first commercial recording for the Signum label, conducted by Edusei.

In November 2019, the Chineke! Foundation became the first-ever recipient of the Royal Philharmonic Society's Gamechanger Award, presented to an individual, group or organisation who in unique and contemporary ways has done inspirational and transformative work breaking new ground in classical music. 

An organisation with the same purpose as The Chineke! Foundation, and one supported by a member of the orchestra Sheku Kanneh-Mason, is Black Lives in Music.

Premieres
Chineke! has given world premieres of new works by black composers including:

James Wilson, The Green Fuse - Pittville Pump Room, Cheltenham, 10 July 2017
Hannah Kendall, The Spark Catchers - BBC Proms, Royal Albert Hall, London, 30 August 2017
Daniel Kidane, Dream Song - Queen Elizabeth Hall, London, 9 April 2018
Julian Joseph, Carry That Sound - Queen Elizabeth Hall, London, 21 July 2018
 Errollyn Wallen, Nnenna, November 2018 Cambridge Festival
James Wilson, Free-man - St. George's, Bristol, 17 May 2019
Roderick Williams, Three Songs from Ethiopia Boy - Queen Elizabeth Hall, London, 7 July 2019
James Wilson, with Yomi Sode, Remnants, première 23 November 2020 at Southbank Centre, London.
 Ayanna Witter-Johnson, Daniel Kidane, Shirley Thompson, Roderick Williams: Song of the Prophets: Requiem for the Climate, July 2021
 Ayanna Witter-Johnson, Blush; Edinburgh Festival August 2021
 Meena Karimi, Dawn; UK/European premiere Queen Elizabeth Hall, London October 2021

Discography
Signum Classics - Sibelius: Finlandia; Dvořák: Symphony No. 9 - Kevin John Edusei, conductor (1 CD, released 7 July 2017)
Signum Classics - Rachmaninov: Piano Concerto No. 3; Sibelius: Symphony No. 2 - Gerard Aimontche, piano; Roderick Cox, conductor (2 CDs, released 28 September 2018)
Orchid Classics - Stewart Goodyear: Callaloo, Piano Sonata; George Gershwin: Rhapsody in Blue - Stewart Goodyear, piano; Wayne Marshall, conductor (1 CD, released 31 May 2019)
NMC - Roderick Williams: Three Songs from Ethiopia Boy - Roderick Williams, baritone; Eduardo Portal, conductor (Download only, released 18 October 2019)
NMC - "Spark Catchers" - Errollyn Wallen: Concerto Grosso; James Wilson: The Green Fuse; Daniel Kidane: Dream Song; Hannah Kendall: The Spark Catchers; Philip Herbert: Elegy: In Memoriam - Stephen Lawrence; Julian Joseph: Carry That Sound - Roderick Williams, baritone; Tai Murray, violin; Chi-chi Nwanoku, double bass; Isata Kanneh-Mason, piano; Anthony Parnther, conductor; Kevin John Edusei, conductor; Wayne Marshall, conductor (1 CD, released 17 January 2020)
The New Four Seasons composed by Max Richter and performed with soloist Elena Urioste (released 10 June 2022 on Deutsche Grammophon)
Coleridge-Taylor - Samuel Coleridge-Taylor: "Othello" Orchestral Suite Op. 79, African Suite op. 35, Ballade in A minor Op. 33, Petite suite de concert Op. 77, Violin concerto op. 80, Romance in G Op. 39, Nonet in F minor Op. 2, Avril Coleridge-Taylor: Sussex Landscape Op. 27; Elena Urioste, violin; Kalena Bovell, Roderick Cox, Kevin John Edusei, Fawzi Haimor, Anthony Partner, conductors (October 2022, Decca Records)

References

External links
 
 Challenge Records page on Signum Classics SIGCD 515

British orchestras
British classical music groups
Musical groups established in 2015
2015 establishments in the United Kingdom